Pollen Street Social is a restaurant in London, England, run by chef Jason Atherton. It was Atherton's first UK solo restaurant, and in 2011 was named the best new UK restaurant by the Good Food Guide, and the best new fine-dining restaurant in London by Time Out. It currently holds one Michelin star, which it gained within a year of opening. Elements in the restaurant such as the dessert bar have been subsequently included in Atherton's other restaurants.

Description
Chef Jason Atherton had previously worked for Gordon Ramsay for ten years before opening his first restaurant, Table No. 1 in Shanghai. In 2011, he opened his first UK based restaurant, Pollen Street Social, which became his flagship location. The name came from the location of the restaurant, and Atherton described the "social" name saying, "I spend quite a lot of time in New York, and places like Stanton Social are popping up; and it's based around people being able to use a fine-dining restaurant for anything they want, not just for the food, but for the atmosphere, for the Champagne, for the private areas, for the bar. So it's a social place." It was funded by twenty years of Atherton's savings, as well as several minor investors in addition to a single private investor who owns 25%. He was relieved that there was a reasonable gap after the opening of Dinner by Heston Blumenthal, due to the buzz caused by Blumenthal's restaurant. The restaurant is located at 8-10 Pollen Street, London, where previously a Pitcher & Piano public house was located. Prior to opening the restaurant, he opened a pop-up restaurant for two days in October 2010 to preview the menu to be served at Pollen Street Social.

The interior of the restaurant is split into two separate rooms, with the bar located away from the main dining area which seats sixty diners. The tables in the dining room are located around a central service area, while the kitchen is at the back of the room, near the dessert bar. The dessert bar allows diners to watch the pastry chefs prepare the desserts. Elements from Pollen Street Social have been introduced to other restaurants run by Atherton. These include the dessert bar, which has been replicated in Atherton's Singapore based Pollen restaurant. Atherton described the most used piece of equipment at the restaurant as a Thermomix, a blender which also heats the food which is used for purées and making hollandaise sauce.

Menu

The initial menu was criticised by critics for being overcomplicated. Due to Atherton's history of working at Maze, there was confusion over whether certain small plates were starters and which were sharing platters. Within a month of opening, this was reduced down to eight starters and eight mains. The desserts include the signature "PBJ", which features peanut butter mousse, cherry jam and rice puffs.

Reception
John Walsh, writing for The Independent described a mackerel dish as being inspired by the Danish restaurant Noma and praised the inventiveness of the dessert bar. He praised the staff, and summed up the restaurant saying " There's a great deal to enjoy at Pollen Street Social. Jason Atherton has put his heart and soul and his considerable imagination into it, and it shows." The Daily Telegraph'''s Zoe Williams thought the interior looked "like a posh All Bar One", and while she praised the starters, she was underwhelmed by the main courses. She gave it a rating of six out of ten. Zoe Strimpel, in her review for City A.M. said that she would return to the restaurant "in a heartbeat". She singled out a smoked foie gras starter for praise, saying that it equalled the meat fruit at Dinner by Heston Blumenthal. She also praised a pork belly main course which was served with seeds, beetroot and chips.

The restaurant was awarded a Michelin star within a year of opening. The restaurant was also awarded the title of BMW Square Meal Restaurant of the Year 2011. In 2012, it was named the best new UK restaurant by the Good Food Guide after it was ranked eighth on their list of the top fifty restaurants. Individual it was given a score of eight out of ten. It has subsequently increased in rank to 6th overall in the 2012 list. Time Out'' named Pollen Street Social as London's best new fine-dining restaurant in 2011.
In 2014 the restaurant won Food and Travel Magazine's Readers Award's "UK Restaurant of the Year"

See also
 List of restaurants in London

References

External links
 Official website

Michelin Guide starred restaurants in the United Kingdom
European restaurants in London
Restaurants established in 2011
2011 in London
2011 establishments in England
Fine dining